Amore Eterno is the début album of Davide Esposito released in December 2007 on Peermusic/Warner Music France. Most of the songs are in Italian, with some in French, Spanish and Russian.

Un Italien à Paris is an Italian and French cover version of Sting's Englishman in New York.

Track listing
"Io so che tu"
"Un Italien à Paris"
"Lontani"
"Avere te"
"Nell'amore immerso"
"Tu ed io"
"Vivo solo per te"
"Stare senza te" (duet with the Russian singer Yelena Neva)
"Danza del corazón" (in Spanish, co-written by Antón García Abril)
"La cosa più bella del mondo"
"Ogni anima"
"Un solo destino"
"Que toi au monde"
"Amore eterno"
"Elle était là"
Bonus track: "Innamorarsi" (available on the online version of the album)

Charts

References

2007 debut albums